Construtora Tenda S.A. or Tenda, until 1994 Tenda Engenharia S.A, is a Brazilian construction company founded in 1969 in Minas Gerais with its headquarters being located in São Paulo. The company  is listed on the São Paulo Stock Exchange where it raised 603 million reais ($345 million) in an initial public offering in 2007.

References

Links Oficiais da Construtora Tenda
 Site Oficial
Blog da Tenda
Loja Virtual Tenda
Simulador de Financiamento
Casa Verde e Amarela
Minha Casa Minha Vida
Apartamentos Minha Casa Minha Vida

Companies based in Minas Gerais
Construction and civil engineering companies established in 1969
Brazilian companies established in 1969
Companies listed on B3 (stock exchange)
Real estate companies of Brazil
Construction and civil engineering companies of Brazil